Dhërmi (Drymádes) is a village in Vlorë County, Albania. It is part of the municipality of Himarë. The village lies 42 kilometers south of the city of Vlorë and about the same distance north of the southern city of Sarandë. It is built on a slope of the Ceraunian Mountains at approximately 200 meters in altitude, and comprises three neighborhoods: Gjilek, Kondraq, Kallami, and Dhërmi itself. The mountains descend to the southwest into the Ionian coast and Corfu in the distance to the south. Nearby is the village of Palasë. The local inhabitants of Dhërmi are ethnic Greeks that mainly speak a variant of the Greek Himariote dialect, and partly the Tosk Albanian dialect. During the last decade, the coastal area has seen a boom in the construction of accommodation facilities, such as wooden villa complexes.

History 
In 1632  the first Albanian school in Dhërmi was founded by Neofit Rodino. Also a Greek-language school, was founded in 1633 in Dhërmi by the same missionary. Additional Greek schools operated by 1682 with the support of the local bishopric of Himara. During the 17th century (precise year is unknown) another Greek school (the Vizilios School) opened under the sponsorship of a local benefactor. In the 1898-1899 school season three Greek schools were operating: elementary, secondary and a girls' school.

On November 5, 1912, when the nearby town of Himara was controlled by the Greek forces of the local major Spyros Spyromilios, armed groups from Dhermi declared that they were prepared to assist his movement for the incorporation of the rest of the region into Greece.

In 2015 the demolition of the local church of St. Athanasius by the state authorities caused a storm of reactions between the Albanian Orthodox Church and the Albanian Government as well as sparked tensions  between the municipality of Himarë and both the local Albanian and ethnic Greek orthodox communities. Three years later the church was being reconstructed. It was second demolition of the specific religious monument by the state authorities, the first having taken place during the era of the People's Republic of Albania, but at the time the church was rebuilt by the local Orthodox Church after the restoration of Democracy in the country (1991).

, Dhërmi has been hosting many music festivals, making it a popular tourist destination.

Demographics 
The village is inhabited by an ethnic Greek community. The inhabitants of Dhërmi are primarily Greek-speaking and partly Tosk Albanian-speaking, calling themselves horiani or Drimadiotes, a term used to denote that they are locals who originate from the village. They speak a variety of the Greek Himariote dialect, which is characterized by archaic features not retained in Standard Modern Greek. There are also some Tosk-speaking and Gheg-speaking newcomers and seasonal workers, who moved to Dhërmi from other parts of Albania during the communist era (1945-1990).

Tourism
Dhërmi is considered to be a popular tourist destination, especially due to its well-known beaches and at times riotous nightclub-based nightlife centred on the modern resorts of Dhërmi's coastline. In 2018 Dhërmi was considered a center in the Albanian Riviera area by the Ministry of Tourism and Environment. The beach is 5km long and it ends into a hill where the monastery of Saint Theodore is located. The former minister Blendi Klosi created a touristic campaign named "Smile Albania" on promoting the local albanian cuisine, part of the "Local products, an added offer in our touristic package". Dhërmi and the rest of Himarë region is famous for the Beekeeping and the production of Honey, where a three-days fair "Mjalt Fest" takes place every year. The government also promotes the "Kala Fest" festival to boost the tourism of Dhërmi.

Landmarks 
Dhërmi Beach
Alevra
Bay of Grama 
The Pirates' cave
The harbor of Gjipe
Hypapante Church, Dhërmi
Panagia Monastery Church, Dhërmi
St. Stephen's Church, Dhërmi

Notable people 
Petro Marko, Albanian writer and founding father of modern Albanian prose.
 Pano Bixhili, diplomat
 Kiço Fotiadhi, the first Albanian TV speaker

Gallery

See also 
Albanian Ionian Sea Coast
Albanian Riviera
Greeks in Albania
Tourism in Albania

Footnotes

References

External links 

 Region of Himara. Official municipality website

Dhërmi
Populated places in Himara
Villages in Vlorë County
Albanian Ionian Sea Coast
Beaches of Albania
Epirus
Labëria
Greek communities in Albania